Zeynal Khan (also Romanized as Zeynal Khān) is a village in Cheleh Rural District, in the Central District of Gilan-e Gharb County, Kermanshah Province, Iran. At the 2006 census, its population was 90, in 21 families.

References 

Populated places in Gilan-e Gharb County